The BM-24 is a multiple rocket launcher designed in the Soviet Union. It is capable of launching 240mm rockets from 12 launch tubes. Versions of the BM-24 have been mounted on the ZIS-151 6×6 Truck chassis and the AT-S tracked artillery tractor, forming the BM-24T from the latter. Production began out of Automotive Factory no. 2 in 1947 Moscow.  Israel operated one battalion, consisting of vehicles captured from Egypt in the Six-Day War. The battalion took part in the Yom Kippur War and the 1982 Lebanon War.

Variants
 BM-24 (8U31) - Basic model, mounted on a ZIS-151 chassis.
 BM-24M (2B3) - Modified model, mounted on a ZIL-157 chassis.
 BM-24T - Tracked model, mounted on an AT-S chassis.
 Israeli upgraded variant.

Operators

Current operators 

 : 30 BM-24 
 
 KN-16 and BM-24

Former operators 

: 48 in store 

: 36 in store

See also
Katyusha rocket launcher

Photo gallery

References

External links

Multiple rocket launchers of the Soviet Union
Military vehicles introduced from 1945 to 1949